The Girl from Alaska is a 1942 American Western film directed by Nick Grinde and William Witney and starring Ray Middleton, Jean Parker and Jerome Cowan.

The film's sets were designed by the art director Russell Kimball.

Plot

Cast
 Ray Middleton as Steve Bentley  
 Jean Parker as Mary 'Pete' McCoy  
 Jerome Cowan as Ravenhill  
 Robert Barrat as Frayne  
 Mala as Charley  
 Francis McDonald as Pelly  
 Raymond Hatton as Shorty  
 Milton Parsons as Sanderson  
 Nestor Paiva as Geroux  
 Ace the Wonder Dog as Tolo, Steve's Dog

References

Bibliography
  Len D. Martin. The Republic Pictures Checklist: Features, Serials, Cartoons, Short Subjects and Training Films of Republic Pictures Corporation, 1935-1959. McFarland, 1998.

External links
 

1942 films
1942 Western (genre) films
American Western (genre) films
Films directed by William Witney
Republic Pictures films
American black-and-white films
1940s English-language films
1940s American films